George Charles Stablein (born October 29, 1957) is a former Major League Baseball pitcher who played in  with the San Diego Padres. He batted and threw right-handed.

He was drafted by the Padres in the 3rd round of the 1978 amateur draft.

External links

1957 births
Living people
Major League Baseball pitchers
Baseball players from Inglewood, California
Cal State Dominguez Hills Toros baseball players
San Diego Padres players
Hawaii Islanders players
Amarillo Gold Sox players
Beaumont Golden Gators players
Reno Silver Sox players
Vancouver Canadians players
American expatriate baseball players in Canada